Syncratomorpha is a genus of moth in the family Gelechiidae. It contains the species Syncratomorpha euthetodes, which is found in India (the Andamans).

The wingspan is about 19 mm. The forewings are ochreous-white, the dorsal area thinly speckled dark fuscous with a broad irregular black median stripe from the base (where it reaches the costa) to near the apex. There is a short mark of fuscous irroration on the costa in the middle and the costal edge is black towards the apex. There are three blackish dots on the lower part of the termen. The hindwings are grey.

References

Pexicopiini